The 1986 Chicago Bears season was their 67th regular season and 17th post-season completed in the National Football League. The Bears entered the season looking to repeat as Super Bowl champions, as they had won in 1985. Chicago managed to finish 14–2, one game off of their 1985 record of 15–1. Although the Bears had an equal 14-2 record as the New York Giants for the league’s best record, the Giants were seeded number one in the NFC for the playoffs due to the Giants having a better conference record (11-1) than that of the Bears (10-2). In going 14-2, the Chicago Bears are the first team in NFL history to have consecutive seasons with 14 or more victories.

After winning the championship in 1985, the Bears seemed like a dynasty in the making. However, quarterback Jim McMahon showed up to training camp 25 pounds overweight – the product of the post-Super Bowl partying he’d partaken in. Nonetheless, he was once again named as the starter. Injuries to his rotator cuff (including a flagrant late-hit by Charles Martin which exacerbated it), however, derailed his season. McMahon played in only six of the team’s first 12 games.

Aided by a strong offensive line, the Bears were once again led on offense by Walter Payton. Payton remained his usual stellar self, posting his 10th and final 1,000-yard season. With McMahon’s poor play, as well as the equally poor play of backups Mike Tomczak, Steve Fuller and Doug Flutie, Payton was the sole spark on offense, which ranked 13th in the NFL.

As had been the case the year before, the Bears were once again led by their explosive defense. Any shortcomings on the offensive side of the ball were more than made up for on the defensive side. They once again were ranked 1st in the NFL. The Bears’ defense became the third defense in the history of the NFL to lead the league in fewest points allowed and fewest total yards allowed for two consecutive seasons. The Bears’ 187 points allowed is the fewest surrendered by any team in the 1980s (other than the strike-shortened 1982 season) – even fewer than the 198 points the Bears allowed in their historic 1985 season.

However, the Bears were not able to recapture their magic from the season before and were bounced from the playoffs in their first game by the Washington Redskins.

1986 NFL Draft

Staff

Roster

Preseason

Regular season

Schedule

Game summaries

Week 1: vs. Cleveland Browns

Week 2: vs. Philadelphia Eagles

Source: Pro-Football-Reference.com

Week 12: vs. Green Bay Packers

Source: Pro-Football-Reference.com

Week 15: at Detroit Lions

Source: Pro-Football-Reference.com

Week 16: at Dallas Cowboys

Source: Pro-Football-Reference.com

Playoffs

Game summary

The 1986 Bears earned a first round playoff bye, but in their opening playoff game, they were upset at home by the Washington Redskins. A holding penalty and a missed field goal by Kevin Butler frustrated the Bears in the first quarter. They still, however, managed to take a 13–7 lead into halftime. But their usually stout defense fell apart in the second half, allowing the Redskins to score 20 unanswered points.

“Maybe my dreams didn’t come true“, said Chicago Coach Mike Ditka. “The defense has to play outstanding and today they were just not up to the way the Redskins were playing.”

Despite injuries to Redskins offensive linemen Joe Jacoby and Russ Grimm, the Washington offensive line was able to pick up the Bears patented blitzes. Washington quarterback Jay Schroeder was sacked only twice. He was also able to use the blitzes to his advantage, completing passes while being chased out of the pocket.

Trailing 14–13 in the 4th quarter, the Bears good fortune ran out, when the usually dependable Payton lost a fumble, which led to an 83-yard touchdown drive by the Redskins. The long drive perpetrated against the NFL’s best defense seemed to take the wind out of the Bears' sails. A few minutes later, the Bears muffed a punt return which set up an easy field goal for the Redskins. The Bears lost 27–13.

Standings

References

External links

 1986 Chicago Bears Season at www.bearshistory.com

NFC Central championship seasons
Chicago Bears
Chicago Bears seasons
Chicago